Al Falaah College is an independent Islamic school situated in the coastal city of Durban, in KwaZulu-Natal, South Africa.

History 
In 1985, Ahmedia School opened its doors in Bellair Road, Cato Manor, Durban. The school marked the establishment of the first Islamically-based independent school in Durban, South Africa.

The school ran for the first year with a student population of 74. The first set of matriculants, a total of 21, graduated from what was then known as Lockhat Islamia College in 1991. The school was housed in Cato Manor for 12 years.

With the growth of the college, in 1998, under the name of Lockhat Islamia College, the high school moved to Umbilo Road, Durban while the primary school remained in Cato Manor, Durban. This move was a temporary move due to the construction of the new campus. In 1999 the college was re-located to its present campus in Lotus Road, Springfield, Durban, KwaZulu-Natal.

Al Falaah College today 
The school enrolment sits at 950 students.
The college caters for both male and female students from Grade R – 12. The intermediate and Further Education and Training (FET) phase have separate classes for male and female students. AFC participates in the National Curriculum Examinations.

School emblem 
The school emblem has changed three times during the school's existence due to the name changes that the school underwent.

The college emblem consists of a crescent to the right, signifying the birth of a new era of enlightenment. The minaret to the left signifies the Muslim call to prayer and the center holds the book of knowledge. The quotation within the book is a saying of the Islamic prophet, Muhammad, encouraging the endeavour towards academic excellence. The quotation says "Seek knowledge from the cradle to the grave."

CAPS Curriculum 

Al Falaah College offers the following CAPS subjects:
 English Home Language
 Afrikaans First Additional Language 
 Mathematics
 Mathematical Literacy 
 Physical Sciences
 Business Studies
 Life Sciences
 Accounting 
 Engineering, Graphics & Design 
 Geography
 Life Orientation

Islamic curriculum 
In addition to the National Curriculum the following studies are integrated into the Al Falaah curriculum: 
Islamic Studies (Theory)
Islamic Studies (Oral)
Arabic
Hifz – Memorization of the Qur'an (Optional)

Academics 
In the Grade 12 examination each year Al Falaah College achieves an average of over two distinctions per student. The College was also voted among the top 18 independent schools in South Africa by The Sunday Times. It was recognised as by the Department of Education to be amongst the top 200 maths and science schools in the country.

Sports 
 Soccer
 Cricket
 Swimming (to be implemented)
 Netball
 Mini-cricket
 Indoor soccer
 Volleyball
 Archery
 Athletics
 Tennis

Achievements 
100% accreditation with UMALUSI (National Monitoring Body for Independent Schools)
Voted among the top 18 independent schools in South Africa (Sunday Times −2005)
100% exemption matric pass rate over the past few years (with over two distinctions per student)
Awarded recognition from Department of Science & Technology for exceptional progress in Science and Mathematics
Awarded recognition for outstanding humanitarian efforts by many non-governmental organisations
Hafiz graduates
Best School at the Global Peace and Unity Festival 2013 (Africa/Primary)

Memberships 
Association of Muslim Schools

Headmasters

Primary school 
T Seymore (1985–1988)
OF Ameen (1989–2012)
Z Muhammad (2013–present)

High school 
EH Khamissa
MS Karodia
Y Salot
Z Ahmed (Current Principal)
A Sujee (Current Deputy Principal)

References

External links 
Al Falaah College official website
Association of Muslim Schools (SA)
Satellite Image of AFC Campus

Islamic schools in South Africa
Private schools in KwaZulu-Natal
Educational institutions established in 1985
1985 establishments in South Africa